The International Conference on Agents and Artificial Intelligence (ICAART) is a meeting point for researchers (among others) with interest in the areas of Agents and Artificial Intelligence. There are 2 tracks in ICAART, one related to Agents and Distributed AI in general and the other one focused in topics related to Intelligent Systems and Computational Intelligence.

The conference program is composed of several different kind of sessions like technical sessions, poster sessions, keynote lectures, tutorials, special sessions, doctoral consortiums, panels and industrial tracks.
The papers presented in the conference are made available at the SCITEPRESS digital library, published in the conference proceedings and some of the best papers are invited to a post-publication with Springer.

ICAART's first edition was in 2009 counting with several keynote speakers like Marco Dorigo, Edward H. Shortliffe and Eduard Hovy. Since then, the conference had several other invited speakers like Katia Sycara, Nick Jennings, Robert Kowalski, Boi Faltings and Tim Finin. Bart Selman is one of the names confirmed for the next edition of this conference.

Since 2012 the conference is held in conjunction with 2 other conferences: the International Conference on Operations Research and Enterprise Systems (ICORES) and the International Conference on Pattern Recognition Applications and Methods (ICPRAM).

Areas

Agents 

 Agent communication languages
 Cooperation and Coordination
 Distributed Problem Solving
 Economic Agent Models
 Emotional Intelligence
 Group Decision Making
 Intelligent Auctions and Markets
 Mobile Agents
 Multi-agent systems
 Negotiation and Interaction Protocols
 Nep News Detection
 Agent Models and Architectures
 Physical Agents at Work
 Privacy, Safety and Security
 Programming Environments and Languages
 Robot and Multi-Robot Systems
 Self Organizing Systems
 Semantic Web
 Simulation
 Swarm Intelligence
 Task Planning and Execution
 Transparency and Ethical Issues
 Agent-Oriented Software Engineering
 Web Intelligence
 Agent Platforms and Interoperability
 Autonomous systems
 Cloud Computing and Its Impact
 Cognitive robotics
 Collective Intelligence
 Conversational Agents

Artificial intelligence 

 AI and Creativity
 Deep Learning
 Evolutionary Computing
 Fuzzy Systems
 Hybrid Intelligent Systems
 Industrial Applications of AI
 Intelligence and Cybersecurity
 Intelligent User Interfaces
 Knowledge Representation and Reasoning
 Knowledge-Based Systems
 Ambient Intelligence
 Machine learning
 Model-Based Reasoning
 Natural Language Processing
 Neural Networks
 Ontologies
 Planning and Scheduling
 Social Network Analysis
 Soft Computing
 State Space Search
 Bayesian Networks
 Uncertainty in AI
 Vision and Perception
 Visualization
 Big Data
 Case-Based Reasoning
 Cognitive Systems
 Constraint Satisfaction
 Data Mining
 Data Science

Editions

ICAART 2023 – Lisbon, Portugal

ICAART 2020 – Valletta, Malta

ICAART 2019 – Prague, Czech Republic 
Proceedings - Proceedings of the 11th International Conference on Web Information Systems and Technologies - Volume 1. 
Proceedings - Proceedings of the 11th International Conference on Web Information Systems and Technologies - Volume 2.

ICAART 2018 – Funchal, Madeira, Portugal 
Proceedings - Proceedings of the 10th International Conference on Web Information Systems and Technologies - Volume 1. 
Proceedings - Proceedings of the 10th International Conference on Web Information Systems and Technologies - Volume 2.

ICAART 2017 – Porto, Portugal 
Proceedings - Proceedings of the 9th International Conference on Web Information Systems and Technologies - Volume 1. 
Proceedings - Proceedings of the 9th International Conference on Web Information Systems and Technologies - Volume 2.

ICAART 2016 – Rome, Italy 
Proceedings - Proceedings of the 8th International Conference on Web Information Systems and Technologies - Volume 1. 
Proceedings - Proceedings of the 8th International Conference on Web Information Systems and Technologies - Volume 2.

ICAART 2015 – Lisbon, Portugal 
Proceedings - Proceedings of the 7th International Conference on Web Information Systems and Technologies - Volume 1. 
Proceedings - Proceedings of the 7th International Conference on Web Information Systems and Technologies - Volume 2.

ICAART 2014 – ESEO, Angers, Loire Valley, France 
Proceedings - Proceedings of the 6th International Conference on Web Information Systems and Technologies - Volume 1. 
Proceedings - Proceedings of the 6th International Conference on Web Information Systems and Technologies - Volume 2.

ICAART 2013 – Barcelona, Spain 
Proceedings - Proceedings of the 5th International Conference on Web Information Systems and Technologies - Volume 1. 
Proceedings - Proceedings of the 5th International Conference on Web Information Systems and Technologies - Volume 2.

ICAART 2012 – Vilamoura, Algarve, Portugal 
Proceedings - Proceedings of the 4th International Conference on Web Information Systems and Technologies - Volume 1. 
Proceedings - Proceedings of the 4th International Conference on Web Information Systems and Technologies - Volume 2.

ICAART 2011 – Rome, Italy 
Proceedings - Proceedings of the 3rd International Conference on Web Information Systems and Technologies - Volume 1. 
Proceedings - Proceedings of the 3rd International Conference on Web Information Systems and Technologies - Volume 2.

ICAART 2010 – Valencia, Spain 
Proceedings - Proceedings of the 2nd International Conference on Web Information Systems and Technologies - Volume 1. 
Proceedings - Proceedings of the 2nd International Conference on Web Information Systems and Technologies - Volume 2.

ICAART 2009 – Porto, Portugal 
Proceedings - Proceedings of the 1st International Conference on Web Information Systems and Technologies.

References

External links 
 

Information systems conferences
Computer science conferences
Academic conferences